The 2003/04 FIS Ski Jumping Continental Cup was the 13th in a row (11th official) Continental Cup winter season and the 2nd summer season in ski jumping for men. 

Other competitive circuits this season included the World Cup and Grand Prix.

Calendar

Men's summer

Men's winter

Standings

Summer

Winter

Europa Cup vs. Continental Cup 
This was originally last Europa Cup season and is also recognized as the first Continental Cup season by International Ski Federation although under this name began its first official season in 1993/94.

References

FIS Ski Jumping Continental Cup
2003 in ski jumping
2004 in ski jumping